Henri Lincoln Fernandes Nascimento (born February 10, 1978), known as Henri Castelli, is a Brazilian actor.

Career
Castelli was hired by Rede Globo in 1998 to make a small participation in the miniseries Hilda Furacão and in the telenovela Pecado Capital as Lobato, a supporting actor. In the following years he acted as Dino, Pércio, Breno and José de Castro in the telenovelas  Esplendor, As Filhas da Mãe, Um Anjo Caiu do Céu and O Quinto dos Infernos, respectively.

Castelli's first role as protagonist was in the ninth season of Malhação in 2002, where he starred Pedro Rodrigues. In 2004 he gave life to his first villain, Jorge Junqueira in Como uma Onda. Castelli played a short time in Belíssima, due to her character having a mysterious death at the beginning of the plot. In 2006 he acted once again as a villain, this time Estevão Pacheco in Cobras & Lagartos. Castelli also co-starred in Caras & Bocas the character Vicente Foster.

Eight years after his last miniseries, he starred in 2010 in Na Forma da Lei as the protagonist Edgar Mourão. After 7 years, in 2013 he returned to act as main character in a telenovela, interpreting Cassiano Soares in Flor do Caribe, along with Grazi Massafera. In 2015, Castelli lived another villain, Gabriel Brenner (Gabo) in I Love Paraisópolis.

Personal life
Castelli married Brazilian supermodel Isabeli Fontana on December 10, 2005 and their son, Lucas, was born on October 23, 2006, in São Paulo. Fontana and Castelli divorced in 2007. In 2008, he began dating the actress Fernanda Vasconcellos. The couple ended the relationship in 2012.

On January 11, 2014, Castelli's girlfriend, journalist Juliana DeSpirito, gave birth to his daughter Maria Eduarda.

Filmography

Television

References

External links 
 

1978 births
Living people
Male actors from São Paulo (state)
Brazilian male telenovela actors
Brazilian male models
People from São Bernardo do Campo
20th-century Brazilian male actors
21st-century Brazilian male actors

Brazilian people of Italian descent